Begonia picta, the painted leaf begonia, is a widespread species of flowering plant in the family Begoniaceae, native to the Himalayan region. It grows relatively high up in the foothills of the Himalayas, typically on shady slopes and moist ledges, and requires high humidity and warm temperatures in cultivation.

References

picta
Flora of Tibet
Flora of Assam (region)
Flora of Bangladesh
Flora of East Himalaya
Flora of India (region)
Flora of West Himalaya
Flora of Myanmar
Plants described in 1806